Long track (more commonly known as the longtrack, or German Sandbahn) is a version of track racing, that takes place on tracks ranging from  in length at high speeds. There are also subtle differences between longtrack and speedway such as the machinery used in longtrack bike is slightly larger and has a two-speed gearbox. Races (or heats) usually consist of six riders although occasionally they have eight. Longtrack is very similar with another form of track racing, Grasstrack. The two sports use the same machinery and have a combined World Championship

The sport is popular in Germany, perhaps even more so than speedway. This means that the majority of tracks are to be found in that country, although tracks can also be found in France, the Netherlands, the Czech Republic, Finland and Norway. Long track meetings are also held in Australia (for both Solos and Sidecars with both state and national championships), New Zealand and the United States with the higher profile Australian and New Zealand Long track Grand Prix's often attracting the top riders from Europe. Due to the lack of genuine Long Track speedways in those countries outside of Europe, meetings generally take place at ½ Mile Harness Racing or Showground venues.

The similarities with speedway means that many riders from that discipline also take part in longtrack. Whilst there are no leagues in longtrack, there are many lucrative open meetings which offer a means of additional income.

Competitions 

The International Motorcycling Federation (FIM), the World's motorcycle racing authority run a World Longtrack series as well as a World Championships. Although both events are named Long Track, they often are competed for on Grass.

The Individual Long Track World Championship competitors must qualify through a series of Qualifiers. Riders must be selected by their nations motorcycling authority. Riders then must compete in Qualifying rounds and hotly contested Semi Finals before reaching the World Longtrack series proper.

The Team Long Track World Championship involves each team consisting of 3 riders racing each other for points. The top team at the end is the winner. Germany have won 8 championships.

See also 
 Track racing

External links 
 Long Track at FIM webside
 Speedway FAQ - speedway-faq.org

 
Track racing
Motorcycle racing by type